Sandi Sejdinovski is a UEFA "A" licensed Slovenian football coach with extensive coaching experience in seven different countries (Slovenia, Brunei Darussalam, Iran, Saudi Arabia, Bulgaria, Egypt, Kuwait).

Coaching career

Alongside fellow Slovenian Ermin Šiljak, Sejdinovski became one of Bulgarian top-tier championship contenders PFC Botev Plovdiv assistant coaches in July 2015, specializing in video examination and scrutinizing the teams and players performances using software. His contract as assistant was officially ended on 10 November 2015. Before going to Bulgaria, the coach helped train and oversee the U17 team of Saudi giants Al-Hilal, making fastidious efforts in order to prepare them well for games as well and to rest them for school examinations.

Served in FC Koper's youth department from June 2016 to October 2017.

Philosophy

While working with Al-Hilal's U17 team, Sejdinovski believed that giving players step-by-step technical, tactical, physical and mental  training was paramount and applied a match preparation system similar to that of a professional club in order to ease the transition into full-time football. Sejdinovski believes that not allowing a parents child to play sports supposing academic performance falters is important as they will learn from their mistakes.

The Slovenian has expressed disappointment in the football development in Asia.

References

External links
 Official Website with CV

Living people
1963 births
Slovenian football managers
Slovenian expatriate sportspeople in Bulgaria
Expatriate football managers in Brunei
Slovenian expatriate sportspeople in Iran
Slovenian expatriate sportspeople in Saudi Arabia
DPMM FC managers
Slovenian expatriate sportspeople in Kuwait
Slovenian expatriate sportspeople in Brunei
Expatriate football managers in Saudi Arabia
Expatriate football managers in Kuwait
Expatriate football managers in Bulgaria
Slovenian expatriate football managers
Al Jahra SC managers
Kuwait Premier League managers